The 2021 Grand National (officially known as the Randox 2021 Grand National for sponsorship reasons) was the 173rd annual running of the Grand National horse race, held at Aintree Racecourse in Liverpool, England, on 10 April 2021. The event was once again sponsored by Randox Health, although the name on the race from this year onwards was shortened to simply "Randox". The total prize fund for the race was £750,000, down by £250,000 from the last meeting in 2019.

The race was won by Minella Times, trained by Henry de Bromhead and ridden by Rachael Blackmore, who became the first female jockey to win the Grand National. De Bromhead, who won the race as a trainer for the first time, also trained the second-place finisher Balko des Flos. The winner was owned by J. P. McManus, who had previously won the race as an owner in 2010 with Don't Push It. The Long Mile was euthanised after fracturing a hind leg. Jockey Bryony Frost was treated for injuries after falling from Yala Enki.

Having been cancelled the year before due to the COVID-19 pandemic, the 2021 race and entire festival meeting took place behind closed doors for the first time in its history, because of continuing restrictions. Despite speculations and calls from some leading figures in racing for the meeting to be pushed back in the calendar so that it could possibly take place when betting shops are open, it was confirmed the race would retain its original date.

The death of Prince Philip, Duke of Edinburgh was announced shortly before the second day of the meeting. The meeting continued as scheduled, with tributes including a two-minute silence before racing, jockeys wearing black armbands on their silks as a mark of respect and the Union Jack on the Queen Mother Stand being lowered to half-mast.

Race card
On 3 February 106 entries were announced. The early favourite in ante-post betting was the 2018 and 2019 winner Tiger Roll, but he was withdrawn before the first scratching stage by the Gigginstown House Stud, citing excessive weight allocation. Cloth Cap was left as the favourite.

Sources: Trainers and weights Jockeys Starting prices

Note Mr/Mrs/Miss/Ms in the jockeys name denotes an amateur.

Race overview 
The race was held without spectators due to COVID-19.  The favourite, Cloth Cap, was the first leader in the race, but was quickly caught by Jett, who then built up a large lead, with Cloth Cap remaining in second for much of the race.  Any Second Now ran into trouble when Double Shuffle fell in front of him in the first half of the race, costing him several lengths. Cloth Cap was pulled up four fences from the end.  On the third-last fence Any Second Now nearly fell.  On the second-last fence, a pack of chasing horses, including Minella Times, Any Second Now, Discorama, Burrows Saint and Balko Des Flos caught Jett, as Jett faded.  Minella Times took the lead on the second-last fence, and maintained it to the finish, while dark horse Balko Des Flos won second-place on the last fence.

The Long Mile suffered an injury while running on a flat portion of the race and was euthanised after the race.  Bryony Frost fell from Yala Enki and needed hospital treatment.

Henry de Bromhead trained the top two finishers in the race, only a few weeks after his horses won the top three races at the Cheltenham Festival.  Jockey Rachael Blackmore recorded the best ever finish for a woman jockey, above the third place finish for Katie Walsh in 2012.  In her interview after the race, Rachael Blackmoore stated "I don't feel male or female. I don't even feel human, I feel unbelievable."

Finishing order 

 Source

Non-finishers 

 Source

Broadcasting and media 

As the Grand National is accorded the status of an event of national interest in the United Kingdom and is listed on the Ofcom Code on Sports and Other Listed and Designated Events, it must be shown on free-to-air terrestrial television in the UK. The race was broadcast live on TV by ITV for the fourth time, and the first year in its new three year deal with the British Horseracing Authority. For Racing TV, the race was called by Stewart Machin, Alan Howes and Simon Holt.

The ITV coverage was presented by Ed Chamberlin and Francesca Cumani. Analysis was provided by former Grand National-winning jockeys Sir Anthony McCoy and Mick Fitzgerald, with Ruby Walsh also contributing via remote link from the course. Reports were provided by Alice Plunkett, Rishi Persad, Luke Harvey and Matt Chapman – who also provided updates on betting during the broadcast. Oli Bell and Chris Hughes covered viewers' comments on social media. The commentary team was Mark Johnson, Ian Bartlett and Richard Hoiles, who called the finish for the fourth time. Following the race, Bell, Fitzgerald and Walsh guided viewers on a fence-by-fence re-run of the race.

Because of the death of Prince Philip, Duke of Edinburgh on 9 April, coverage of the second day of the meeting was moved to ITV4, with no advertisement breaks or sponsorship bumpers.

In the Republic of Ireland, the race was broadcast on Virgin Media One.

See also
Horse racing in Great Britain
List of British National Hunt races

References

External links
Grand National Official Website
Grand National Beginner's Guide

2021
Grand National
Grand National
21st century in Merseyside
Grand National